Jean-Pierre Van Lerberghe (born 24 April 1947) is a Belgian weightlifter. He competed at the 1968 Summer Olympics and the 1976 Summer Olympics.

References

1947 births
Living people
Belgian male weightlifters
Olympic weightlifters of Belgium
Weightlifters at the 1968 Summer Olympics
Weightlifters at the 1976 Summer Olympics
People from Ixelles
Sportspeople from Brussels
20th-century Belgian people